Pipaona is a village in the municipality of Ocón, in the province and autonomous community of La Rioja, Spain. As of 2018, it had a population of 49 people.

References

Populated places in La Rioja (Spain)